South Devon UTC is a mixed University Technical College (UTC) located in Newton Abbot, Devon, England. It opened in 2015 and caters for students aged 14–19 years. It is located on a former motor dealer site, which was vacated in 2012.

References

External links 
 South Devon UTC official site

Secondary schools in Devon
Educational institutions established in 2015
2015 establishments in England
University Technical Colleges